Bike taxi may refer to:

Cycle rickshaw, a hatchback tricycle designed to carry passengers
Motorcycle taxi, a licensed motorcycle designed to carry passengers

See also
Bicycle taxi (disambiguation)